Acacia jibberdingensis, also known as Jibberding wattle or willow-leafed wattle, is a shrub or tree belonging to the genus Acacia and the subgenus Juliflorae that is endemic to Western Australia.

Description
It has angled slightly hairy branchlets with patent to ascending evergreen phyllodes with a flat linear shape that is straight to slightly curved. It blooms from June to October producing bright yellow perfumed flower-spikes.

Taxonomy
The species was first formally described by the botanists Joseph Maiden and William Blakely in 1927 as part of the work Descriptions of fifty new species and six varieties of western and northern Australian Acacias, and notes on four other species as published in the Journal of the Royal Society of Western Australia. It was reclassified as Racosperma jibberdingense by Leslie Pedley in 2003 then was transferred back to genus Acacia in 2006. The type specimen was collected by M.Koch in 1960 at Jibberding near Dalwallinu.

Distribution
It is native to an area in the Mid West, Wheatbelt and Goldfields regions of Western Australia where it is often found among granite outcrops growing is sandy loamy soils. The population is scattered from Mullewa and Jingemarra Station in the north down to around Peak Charles National Park in the south east where it is mostly found in shrubland communities.

Cultivation
It is available for cultivation in seed form but the seeds must scarified prior to planting. It grows best in well-drained soils in a sunny position and is both frost and drought tolerant.

See also
List of Acacia species

References

jibberdingensis
Acacias of Western Australia
Plants described in 1927
Taxa named by Joseph Maiden
Taxa named by William Blakely